Dudensen is a village of Neustadt am Rübenberge in the district of Hanover, Lower Saxony in Germany. It had a population of 530 in 2021.

Toponymy 
In the district Dudensen are the abandoned villages Holinbeke and Sesenhusen. Both are each named in a deed of donation, the former from 1033, the second 1186. 
Both deserts can be found with Seenser Feld and Hollenheide still in today's names.

In her work on names of places in Neustadt am Rübenberge, Tanja Weiß uses two different names. Already in 1128 there is a documentary recorded Duotdenhusen. In a document from 1228 finally appears the name Dudenhusen. 
There are also two other secondary sources that indicate the year 1228 as the date of the first documentary mention of the place Dudensen under the name Dudenhusen. 
However, two other sources indicate the year 1261 for the first written mention. 
In contrast, however, the entry in the Hoyer Lehnsregister around the year 1250 that count Heinrich von Hoya in Dudenhusen two hooves as possession.
Still in the year 1859 the place is officially listed as Duensen, as it still occurs in the linguistic usage.

Governance 
The name of the borough has been Mühlenfelder Land since November 2011. 
The local council is made up of a councilwoman and ten councilors. The local council also has 17 advisory members.

Geography 
West of Dudensen in the western part of Dudenser bog is located the source of the creek called Alpe.

The place belongs together with Nöpke, Borstel and Hagen to Mühlenfelder Land.

Religion 

In a decree of May 17, 1811, the district In den Meyerhöfen, which until then belonged to the parish Mandelsloh, was incorporated into Dudensen. 
In 1824 Dudensen is listed as a parish village, that means in the village a pastor had his seat. 
In 1871, 476 of the inhabitants, 475 were Protestant and one Catholic.

References

External links

Neustadt am Rübenberge
Villages in Lower Saxony